William Henry Carr (15 November 1848 – 22 February 1924) was an England international footballer who played as a goalkeeper.

Career
Born in Sheffield, Carr played for Owlerton, and earned one cap for England in 1875.

References

1848 births
1924 deaths
Footballers from Sheffield
English footballers
England international footballers
Association football goalkeepers
Owlerton F.C. players